The Swedish Ice Hockey Leader of the Year (Swedish: Årets Ledare) is an annual award given to the best ice hockey leader in Sweden each season. The award was first given in the 1991–92 season, and Kamratföreningen Hockeyjournalisterna is the jury which votes on the award. Swedish businessman Percy Nilsson gives out the award since 2006.

Winners
1991–92: Percy Nilsson, Malmö Redhawks
1992–93: Sture Andersson, MoDo Hockey
1993–94: Bengt Nilsson, Huddinge IK
1994–95: Denny Eriksson, HV71
1995–96: Åke Wikman, Luleå HF
1996–97: Jan Simons, Mora IK
1997–98: Verner Persson, AIK
1998–99: Börje Olsson, Brynäs IF
1999–2000: Lennart Grevé, IF Björklöven
2000–01: Mats Waltin, Djurgårdens IF
2001–02: Håkan Loob, Färjestad BK
2002–03: Kent Norberg, Timrå IK
2003–04: Jan Simons (2), Mora IK
2004–05: Benny Westblom, Frölunda HC
2005–06: Magnus Hävelid, Linköpings HC
2006–07: Erik Holmberg, Modo Hockey
2007–08: Roger Hansson, Rögle BK
2008–09: Mats Hedenström, AIK
2009–10: Lars Johansson, Skellefteå AIK
2010–11: Henrik Evertsson, Växjö Lakers
2011–12: Björn Hellkvist, Rögle BK
2012–13: Lars Johansson (2), Skellefteå AIK
2013–14: Per Kenttä, Asplöven HC
2014–15: Sam Hallam, Växjö Lakers
2015–16: Roger Rönnberg, Frölunda HC
2016–17: Peter Hermodsson, Mora IK
2017–18: Kent Norberg (2), Timrå IK
2018–19: Per Kenttä (2) and Martin Åkerberg, IK Oskarshamn
2019–20: No award due to COVID-19
2020–21: Sam Hallam (2), Växjö Lakers

See also
Coach of the Year (ice hockey)

References

Årets ledare - Svenska Ishockeyförbundet (in Swedish)

External links

Swedish Hockey League
1992 establishments in Sweden
Awards established in 1992
Swedish ice hockey trophies and awards
Ice hockey people in Sweden